The governor of La Union is the chief executive of the provincial government of La Union.

List of governors of La Union

There have been twenty-seven (27) provincial governors of La Union since the establishment of civil government by the Americans in 1901.

References

Governors of La Union
La Union
1901 establishments in the Philippines